Michele Richardson Armengol (born April 28, 1969) is an American former competition swimmer and Olympic silver medalist.  Born in Managua, Nicaragua, she represented the United States as a 15-year-old at the 1984 Summer Olympics in Los Angeles.  She won a silver medal in the women's 800-meter freestyle, finishing second in 8:30.73, behind American teammate Tiffany Cohen.

Both of Richardson's parents are American, and Richardson moved to the United States at the age of ten due to the Nicaraguan Revolution.  Richardson initially wanted to represent Nicaragua in international competition, but was denied by the newly established government. Richardson is the sister of Frank Richardson, who swam for Nicaragua in international competition.  Richardson swam for Clemson University from 1989 to 1992.  She was the ACC champion in the 1650-yard freestyle in 1989. She is also of Cuban descent.

See also
 List of Clemson University Olympians
 List of Olympic medalists in swimming (women)

References

External links
 

1969 births
Living people
American female freestyle swimmers
Clemson Tigers women's swimmers
Olympic silver medalists for the United States in swimming
Sportspeople from Managua
Swimmers at the 1984 Summer Olympics
Medalists at the 1984 Summer Olympics
Nicaraguan people of American descent
Nicaraguan people of Cuban descent
American sportspeople of Cuban descent